Daizinyat also spelled as Dai Zinyat is a tribe of Hazaras in Afghanistan, who live mainly in the Badghis region, Qala e Naw, located the east of Darya'e Kas (Kas river). It is a famous fort and place that this tribe lived in and one of the populated areas of Badghis. They were established by Nadir Shah Afshar and belong to the Daizangi tribe of Hazaras, most probably from the Ghor region. One of their elders, Sardar Hussain Khan, was appointed the governor of Herat by Nasir Shah. They live in and around the Dara'e Ab Kaka, Ab Mohra and surrounding Qala'e Naw, and are also called Hazara-i-Qala e Nau. They profess Sunni Islam, in contrast to the mainly Shia Hazaras of Hazarajat.

See also 
 List of Hazara tribes

References

Hazara people
Hazara tribes
Ethnic groups in Badghis Province